Ludwig Trepte (born 17 May 1988 in East Berlin) is a German television and film actor best known internationally for a leading role as Viktor Goldstein in Generation War (2013) and for his role as Alexander Edel in the German miniseries  (2015).

Life and acting career 
His father is Stephan Trepte who was a member of the East German rock group Lift, Electra and Reform. He did not receive formal drama training and began his acting career at the age of twelve when he appeared in the German television mini-series  (2001).

In 2006, he played the leader of a Nazi clique in his second feature film Kombat Sixteen. For his third major role in the feature film Keller, he received the award for best young actor at the 27th Film Festival Max Ophüls Prize 2006.

Furthermore, Trepte was leading actor in the TV movie Auf ewig und einen Tag (2006), the film Seven Days Sunday (2007) and in the television movie Guten Morgen, Herr Grothe (Good Morning, Mr. Grothe) (2007), for which he received the Grimme Prize in 2008. In director Christoph Röhl's film Ein Teil von mir ('A Part of Me') he played a reserved, amiable and out of responsibility for his child, stealing very young man who has surprisingly become a father. In the youth drama Outta Control in 2008, he played the role of a behavioral adolescent, for which he again in 2009 received the Grimme-Preis. In 2009, he went to France, to film  directed by Wolfgang Fischer and starring Frederick Lau and Alice Dwyer.

Ludwig Trepte received international attention in 2013 as 'Viktor Goldstein' in the three-part TV movie Generation War (or 'Our Mothers, Our Fathers' in Germany). The film was awarded in 2014 with the international Emmy in the category TV Movie / Mini-Series. In 2013, he stood in front of the camera for the eight-part Danish television series 1864, which revolves around the defeat of Denmark in the German-Danish War of 1864. The script and direction was the responsibility of Ole Bornedal. Also Trepte turned in leading roles for the Christian Schwochow tv film  and movie Im Spinnwebhaus. The short film The Last Will by Dustin Loose based on the eponymous short story by Swedish bestselling author Håkan Nesser, It was a Finalist for Foreign Film at the Student Academy Awards in 2015.

In 2014, Ludwig Trepte took over the role of 'Lothar Erler' in the three-part Tannbach - fate of a village under the direction of Alexander Dierbach, in addition to Nadja Uhl, Martina Gedeck and Jonas Nay.

Awards
 2006: Won - Best Young Actor at the 27th Film Festival Max Ophüls Prize for Keller - Teenage Wasteland
 2008:the Goldene Kamera's Young Talent Award - "Lilli Palmer & Curd Jürgens Memorial Camera" 
 2009: the Grimme Prize for Guten Morgen, Herr Grothe
 2012: Nomination – Jupiter Award for Best German Actor for Was du nicht siehst

Filmography

Film

Television

Personal life
Trepte is married and lives in Berlin with his wife Deborah, who works at a film PR agency, and their daughter Mathilda, born in 2011. On 20 August 2018 it was announced that he and his wife are expecting their second child. He has three half-brothers and a half-sister.

References

External links 
 

Living people
1988 births
German male film actors
German male television actors
Male actors from Berlin
People from East Berlin